Vilmos Sebők (born 13 June 1973) is a Hungarian former professional footballer who played as a centre-back.

He made his debut for the Hungary national team in 1996, and has got 52 caps and 9 goals. He was a participant at the 1996 Summer Olympics in Atlanta, where Hungary failed to progress from the group stage.

His most remembered moment in club football was when he played for FC Energie Cottbus in the Bundesliga, because there he scored the goal for Cottbus when they beat Bayern Munich 1–0 at Cottbus.

Sebők guided Újpest FC to the 1998 Hungarian League title before moving to Bristol City F.C. in 1999.

Honours
Újpest
 Hungarian League: 1998, runner-up 1997
 Hungarian Cup: runner-up 1998

References

External links
Personal website

Living people
1973 births
Hungarian footballers
Footballers from Budapest
Association football central defenders
Hungary international footballers
Hungary under-21 international footballers
Footballers at the 1996 Summer Olympics
Olympic footballers of Hungary
Nemzeti Bajnokság I players
Bundesliga players
Israeli Premier League players
Újpest FC players
Bristol City F.C. players
FC Energie Cottbus players
SV Waldhof Mannheim players
Maccabi Ahi Nazareth F.C. players
Diósgyőri VTK players
Hungarian expatriate footballers
Hungarian expatriate sportspeople in Germany
Expatriate footballers in Germany
Hungarian expatriate sportspeople in England
Expatriate footballers in England
Hungarian expatriate sportspeople in Israel
Expatriate footballers in Israel